LeBaron Bradford Colt (June 25, 1846 – August 18, 1924) was a United States senator from Rhode Island and a United States circuit judge of the United States Court of Appeals for the First Circuit and of the United States Circuit Courts for the First Circuit and previously was a United States District Judge of the United States District Court for the District of Rhode Island.

Education and career

Born on June 25, 1846, in Dedham, Massachusetts, Colt attended the public schools and Williston Seminary. He received an Artium Baccalaureus degree in 1868 from Yale University and a Bachelor of Laws in 1870 from Columbia Law School. At Yale, Colt was a member of Skull and Bones. Following graduation, he devoted a year to European travel. He entered private practice in Chicago, Illinois from 1871 to 1875. He continued private practice in Bristol, Rhode Island from 1875 to 1879. He was a member of the Rhode Island House of Representatives from 1879 to 1881.

Federal judicial service

Colt was nominated by President James A. Garfield on March 9, 1881, to a seat on the United States District Court for the District of Rhode Island vacated by Judge John Power Knowles. He was confirmed by the United States Senate on March 21, 1881, and received his commission the same day. His service terminated on July 23, 1884, due to his elevation to the First Circuit.

Colt was nominated by President Chester A. Arthur on July 2, 1884, to a seat on the United States Circuit Courts for the First Circuit vacated by Judge John Lowell. He was confirmed by the Senate on July 5, 1884, and received his commission the same day. Colt was assigned by operation of law to additional and concurrent service on the United States Court of Appeals for the First Circuit on June 16, 1891, to a new seat authorized by 26 Stat. 826 (Evarts Act). On December 31, 1911, the Circuit Courts were abolished and he thereafter served only on the Court of Appeals. His service terminated on February 7, 1913, due to his resignation.

Congressional service

Colt was elected in 1913 as a Republican to the United States Senate. He was reelected in 1919 and served from March 4, 1913, until his death in Bristol on August 18, 1924. He was Chairman of the Committee on Conservation of Natural Resources for the 65th United States Congress and Chairman of the Committee on Immigration for the 66th through 68th United States Congresses. He voted against the Immigration Act of 1924 and supported women's suffrage.

He was interred in Juniper Hill Cemetery in Bristol.

Family

Colt was the son of Christopher Colt (the brother of arms maker Samuel Colt) and Theodora Goujand DeWolf Colt; his younger brother, Samuel P. Colt, was a prominent Rhode Island businessman and politician.

See also
 List of United States Congress members who died in office (1900–49)

References

External links
 
 

 

1846 births
1924 deaths
19th-century American judges
Burials at Juniper Hill Cemetery
Columbia Law School alumni
Judges of the United States Court of Appeals for the First Circuit
Judges of the United States District Court for the District of Rhode Island
Republican Party members of the Rhode Island House of Representatives
People from Bristol, Rhode Island
Politicians from Dedham, Massachusetts
Politicians from Providence, Rhode Island
Republican Party United States senators from Rhode Island
United States federal judges appointed by Chester A. Arthur
United States federal judges appointed by James A. Garfield
Yale University alumni
Lawyers from Dedham, Massachusetts
DeWolf family
Colt family